The China-Africa Development Fund, more commonly known as CAD Fund, is a Chinese private equity fund solely funded by China Development Bank, a Chinese government policy bank. The aim of the fund is to stimulate investment in Africa by Chinese companies in power generation, transportation infrastructure, natural resources, manufacturing, and other sectors.

History
The creation of CAD Fund was announced as one of the "Eight Measures" for Sino-African relations at the Beijing summit of the Forum on China-Africa Cooperation (FOCAC) by President Hu Jintao on November 4, 2006.  It was established in June 2007 with US$1 billion of initial funding by the China Development Bank and is envisioned to grow to US$5 billion in the future.  The fund entered into its second round of fundraising in May 2010 to raise US$2 billion. In 2015, China announced its plan to expand the CAD fund to $10 billion.

Investments
The fund's primary purpose is foster Sino-African investment through bridging finance, financial advice, Africa specific managerial advice, and identification of potential investment opportunities as well as connecting African projects to Chinese investors.

As of 2010 the fund had invested in 30 projects in Africa worth around US$800 million.  In 2009 alone, the fund invested US$140 million of China's total US$1.3 billion invested in Africa that year. The fund primarily focused on industrial development. For example, in 2010 it teamed up with several partners by contributing 382.5 million ZAR into a 1.65 billion ZAR investment by Jidong Cement to build a cement plant in Limpopo, South Africa.

The fund has also participated in acquiring natural resource assets by forming a joint venture with China National Nuclear Corporation (then China Guangdong Nuclear Power Group) to acquire most of the Husab Mine for US$996 million in February 2012.

The fund made a rare move in media in December 2013 when it was the financial partner in the acquisition of 20% of Independent News and Media SA, a newspaper publishing house in South Africa, for 400 million ZAR.

List of equity investments 
 China-Africa Xinyin Investment (35%)
 Huayou Cobalt (7.59%)
 Africa World Airlines

Grants and other activities 
The China Africa Development Fund provides support in connection with the overseas special economic zones that Chinese enterprises have established in Africa.  Although the Chinese government generally takes a hands-off approach to the development of these zones, leaving it to Chinese enterprises to work with host countries to establish them, the CAD Fund provides support in the form of grants, loans, and subsidies.

See also
 Belt and Road Initiative
 Africa–China relations

References

External links 

 

Private equity firms of China
Africa–China relations
2007 establishments in China
Government-owned companies of China